Laqaya (Aymara for ruins of a building) is an archaeological site in the Altiplano of Bolivia. It is situated in the Potosí Department, Nor Lípez Province, Colcha "K" Municipality. The site was declared a National Archaeological Monument by Supreme Decrete 27607 on July 2, 2004.

References 

Archaeological sites in Bolivia
Potosí Department

qu:Laqaya